Rudolf Nuude (25 June 1909, in Gdov, Pskov Governorate – 2 September 1980, in Tallinn) was an Estonian actor.

From 1931 until 1936 he worked at Narva Theatre. From 1936 until 1938, and again from 1949 until 1968, at Estonian Drama Theatre. From 1938 until 1942, he was engaged as an actor at the at Tallinna Töölisteater, and 1942 until 1949 at the Estonia Theatre. He is the uncle of weightlifter and singer Mati Nuude.

Selected filmography

 1947 Elu tsitadellis (feature film; role: Ants Kuslap, Major of the Soviet Army)
 1951 Valgus Koordis (feature film; role: Maasalu)
 1955 Jahid merel (feature film; role: Bobrov)
 1955 Andruse õnn (feature film; role: Rannap)
 1959 Juunikuu päevad (feature film; role: Prants)
 1959 Vallatud kurvid (feature film; role: Coach)
 1959 Kutsumata külalised (feature film; role: Andres)
 1960 Perekond Männard (feature film; role: Karl Neider)
 1960 Näitleja Joller (television film; role: Johannes)
 1961 Ohtlikud kurvid (feature film; role: Coach)
 1962 Ühe katuse all (feature film; role: Jaagup)
 1962  Jääminek (feature film; role: Arvo)
 1963 Jäljed (feature film; role: Ronk)
 1965 Me olime 18 aastased (feature film; role: Policeman)

References

1909 births
1980 deaths
Estonian male stage actors
Estonian male film actors
Estonian male radio actors
20th-century Estonian male actors
People from Pskov Oblast